The Ingrid Jonker Prize is a literary prize for the best debut work of Afrikaans or English poetry. It was instituted in honor of Ingrid Jonker after her death in 1965.

The yearly prize, consisting of R10,000 and a medal, is awarded alternately to an Afrikaans or English poet who has published a first volume in the previous two years.

Award Winners
2022 - Jacques Coetzee - An Illuminated Darkness
2021 - Ryan Pedro - Pienk ceramic-hondjies
2020 - Saaleha Idrees Bamjee - Zikr
2019 - Pieter Odendaal - Asof geen berge ooit hier gewoon het nie
2018 - Sindiswa Busuku-Mathese - Loud And Yellow Laughter
2017 - Hilda Smits - die bome reusagtig soos ons was
2016 - Thabo Jijana - Failing Maths and my other crimes
2015 - Nathan Trantraal - Chokers en survivors
2014 - Karin Schimke - Bare & Breaking
2013 - Hennie Nortjé  - In die skadu van soveel bome             
2012 - Beverly Rycroft - Missing
2011 - Melt Myburgh - oewerbestaan
2010 - At first there was not to be an award; later it was announced that Tanya van Schalkwyk won for her volume Hyphen
2009 - Loftus Marais - Staan in die algemeen nader aan vensters
2008 - Megan Hall - Fourth Child
2007 - Danie Marais - In die buitenste ruimte
2006 - Rustum Kozain - This Carting Life
2005 - Ilse van Staden - Watervlerk
2004 - Finuala Dowling - i flying
2003 - Martjie Bosman - Landelik
2002 - Kobus Moolman - Time like stone
2001 - Zandra Bezuidenhout - Dansmusieke
2000 - Brian Walter - Tracks
1999 - Trienke Laurie - Skietspoel
1998 - Dan Wylie - The road out
1997 - Charl-Pierre Naude - Die nomadiese oomblik
1996 - Steve Shapiro - In a borrowed tent
1995 - Gert Vlok Nel - Om te lewe is onnatuurlik
1995 - Ken Barris - An advertisement for air
1994 - No award
1993 - P.J. Bosman - Ryp geel kring
1992 - Heather Robinson - Under the sun
1991 - H.J. Pieterse - Alruin
1990 - John Eppel - Spoils of War
1989 - Rosa Smit - Krone van die narsing
1988 - Graham Walker - The complete Libby Destrudo songbook
1987 - Donald W. Riekert - Heuning uit die swarthaak
1986 - No award
1985 - No award
1984 - Johann Lodewyk Marais - Die somer is 'n dag oud 
1983 - Jeremy Cronin - Inside and out
1982 - Johann de Lange - Akwarelle van die dors
1981 - T.T. Cloete - Angelliera
1980 - No award
1979 - Mike Nicol - Among the souvenirs
1978 - Marlene van Niekerk - Sprokkelster
1977 - Colin Style - Baobab Street  
1976 - J.C. Steyn - Die grammatika van liefhê
1975 - Mark Swift - Treading water
1974 - Leon Strydom - Geleentheidsverse
1973 - Mongane Wally Serote - Yakhal'Inkomo
1972 - Lina Spies - Digby Vergenoeg
1971 - No award
1970 - Sheila Cussons - Plektrum
1969 - Sinclair Simon Maurice Beiles - Ashes of experience
1968 - M.M. Walters - Apocrypha and Cabala
1967 - Sydney Clouts - One life
1966 - D.P.M. Botes - Wat is 'n gewone man?
1965 - Ruth Miller - Floating island

References

South African literary awards
Poetry awards
Awards established in 1965
South African literary events